Cogo may refer to:

COGO, coordinate geometry software
CoGo, a bikeshare system in Columbus, Ohio
Cogo, Equatorial Guinea, town
Cogo, Tibet, village
Cogo (toy company), a Chinese company of brick toys